You Have Been Watching is a British comedy panel game presented by Charlie Brooker, produced by Zeppotron for Channel 4 and filmed at BBC Television Centre (pilot and series 2) and Riverside Studios (series 1) in London. It first aired on 7 July 2009 for a weekly eight-episode run. Each week Brooker is accompanied by a panel of three guests. The focus of the quiz is television - before recording, guest panellists watch selected episodes of various television shows. They then may be asked to suggest hypothetical improvements to the format, critically assess it or to answer quiz questions on the content.

The title derives from the caption David Croft used to list the cast members in his trademark end credits.

A second series of the show began on 15 April 2010. The final episode, a crime special, was postponed until August due to the Cumbria shootings having taken place that same week.

The series has a website, "YHBW! TV Club", providing the show with an interactive element. A topic of the next week's show is revealed at the end of each episode so that viewers could watch and submit their own comments.

An Australian version of the show, written and hosted by comedian Peter Berner, premiered on The Comedy Channel on 17 February 2011.

Transmissions

References

External links

2009 British television series debuts
2010 British television series endings
2000s British game shows
2010s British game shows
British panel games
Channel 4 comedy
Channel 4 panel games
E4 (TV channel) original programming
Television series about television
Television series by Banijay
Television series by Zeppotron
Television series created by Charlie Brooker